Youths for Human Rights Protection and Transparency Initiative (YARPTI) is a non governmental organization in Nigeria dedicated to promoting the well-being and protection of children and  young people. YARPTI  also exposes human rights abuses, it was founded on the 2nd of April, 2015. The organization opposes violations of what it considers basic human rights.

Vision and Mission
Yarpti’s mission is to  promote and protect the rights of  children and young people and to also expose human rights abuses. The organization also offer support to  young people  to help  them  mature into adults who contribute to society. YARPTI is also geared towards providing hope for the hopeless.

Leadership
The  president and founder of the organization is Kenneth Uwadi.  Uwadi is a popular socio political crusader from Imo state of Nigeria

Programs
Yarpti speak out against corruption in Nigeria and promote transparency, accountability and integrity at all levels and across all sectors of the Nigerian society as well as seeking the empowerment of the Nigerian youth, disabled children, women, vulnerable individuals and the disadvantaged and poorest communities in rural and urban areas to enable them to participate actively in social and economic decision making processes.

See also
 Human rights in Nigeria
 Kenneth Uwadi

References

http://www.thenigerianvoice.com/news/176338/1/free-samuelson-iwuoha-now.html
http://yarpti.org/about-us/
http://www.spyghana.com/tag/youths-for-rights-protection-and-transparency-initiative/
http://chidioparareports.blogspot.com/2015/04/news-release-free-activist-samuelson.html
http://nigerianewspoint.com/?p=2019
http://www.riversstatenews.com/yrpti-condemns-attack-on-journalists/
http://imo.citynewsline.com.ng/news/yrpti-condemns-attack-on-journalists
http://africanheraldexpress.com/blog8/2015/02/03/the-brutality-and-intimidation-meted-out-on-journalist-greg-okey-nwadike-in-imo-state/
http://leadership.ng/news/435744/huriwa-backs-speaker-uwajumogu-for-ministerial-slot
http://www.thenigerianvoice.com/news/216920/popular-socio-political-crusader-comrade-kenneth-uwadi-res.html
http://newsexpressngr.com/news/detail.php/detail.php?news=23373&title=Popular-Imo-socio-political-crusader-resigns-appointment,-accuses-oil-services-firm-of-ethnic-bias

External links
http://yarpti.org/
http://nigerianewspoint.com/?p=2019
http://allafrica.com/stories/201502090375.html
http://www.newsexpressngr.com/news/detail.php?news=11447&title=Corruption-Dont-make-Uwajumogu-a-Minister-Group-tells-Buhari-Im-innocent-Imo-Speaker
https://www.nationaldailyng.com/test/index.php/news/latest-news/3922-youths-protest-nomination-of-imo-speaker-for-ministerial-appointment
http://www.dailytrust.com.ng/sunday/index.php/news/20819-huriwa-clears-imo-speaker-of-corruption-ritual-killings-allegations
http://www.dailytrust.com.ng/news/letters/free-emeka-ugwuonye-now/154018.html

Organizatons
Non-profit organizations based in Nigeria
Human rights organizations based in Nigeria
Youth organizations based in Nigeria